The Ballajá Barracks (Cuartel de Ballajá in Spanish) is a historic building and former military barracks located in the Ballajá section of Old San Juan, in the city of San Juan, Puerto Rico. It is located close to El Morro and its esplanade, between the Morovis, Beneficiencia and Norzagaray streets. It was built from 1854 to 1864 to house Spanish and Puerto Rican regiments. The Ballajá Barracks were the last large-scale construction project made by the Spanish Crown in the Americas.

The building has been owned by the government of Puerto Rico since 1976 and today it houses the Museum of the Americas and the Puerto Rican Academy of the Spanish Language, in addition to several businesses and institutions such as a dance school, exhibition spaces, restaurants and the State Office of Historic Conservation.

History 
The Ballajá Barracks were built by the Spanish militia from 1854 to 1864. To build it, six blocks from the Ballajá subbarrio (in Old San Juan) were expropriated from the Dominican Order and demolished in 1853. It could accommodate over 1,000 citizens, originally Spanish soldiers and their families. Its vast interior patio is one of the best examples of 19th-century Spanish architecturein Puerto Rico.

Other than the housing facilities, the barracks had storage rooms, kitchens, mess halls, dungeons, and horse stables.

Spanish–American War 
The barracks were heavily used during the Spanish–American War near the end of the 19th century. On May 12, 1898, during the American bombing of San Juan, the fleet led by Admiral William T. Sampson damaged the northeast side of the barracks.

After the war ended, and with the change of sovereignty, the barracks became the quarters for the United States Army until 1939.

World War II 

During the Second World War, the barracks were used as a military hospital, under the name of Army General Hospital of Fort Brooke. On August 31, 1944, the United States Department of War issued General Order No. 71 which renamed the hospital to Rodriguez (161st) General Hospital, in honor of Major Fernando E. Rodríguez Vargas. 

After the end of the war, the building was abandoned and it rapidly decayed. Although it was in disrepair, the building was included in the first heritage list of historic structures and monuments prepared by academic architect Mario J. Buschiazzo for the Puerto Rico Planning Board in 1955. Scholar and archaeologist Ricardo Alegría proposed revitalization of the building for it to be used as an academic or educational institution.

Today 
The Ballajá Barracks today house several educational and cultural organizations, namely the Museo de las Américas on the second floor of the building since 1992. This museum is dedicated to the history, culture and heritage of the American continent. The Museo de Las Américas has three permanent collections: African Heritage, the Indian in America, and Popular Arts in America. In addition to the museum on the second floor, the first floor houses a dance school specializing in tablao flamenco, a bar, a movie theater, a coffee exhibition and café, and a Spanish restaurant called Rincón Ibérico, while the second-floor hosts offices and academic institutions such as the Puerto Rican Academy of the Spanish Language and the State Office of Historic Conservation.

The building sustained damages after Hurricane Maria but restoration was successful with help of more than $17.5 million in FEMA grants. After careful structural analysis and studies from the State Historic Preservation Office, a sedum green roof (or living roof) was installed in the barracks rooftop. This area is open to visitors, and it consists of observation and sitting areas, walkways and solar panels.

Ownership 
Initially, when Puerto Rico was ceded by Spain to the United States, the federal government paid the Catholic Church for this property, among others in the area. Ownership of the property, claimed by the Catholic Church, was not a straightforward matter and had to be resolved by the Supreme Court.

The Government of Puerto Rico acquired the building in 1976 through a transfer from the Government of the United States with the commitment of restoring it and using it for cultural, educative, and touristic purposes. In 1986, a reform plan for the San Juan Historic Zone was sketched and the building was restored from 1990 to 1993.

Gallery

See also 

 Old San Juan

References

External links
 
 Official site

Old San Juan, Puerto Rico
Buildings and structures in San Juan, Puerto Rico
Tourist attractions in San Juan, Puerto Rico